Holdaway is a surname. Notable people with the name include:
Guy Holdaway (1886–1973), British athlete
Hubert Holdaway (1896–1963), New Zealand teacher, orchardist, Methodist lay preacher and pacifist
Jim Holdaway (1927–1970), British illustrator
Richard Holdaway (born 1949), British space engineer
Ronald M. Holdaway (born 1934), American military judge
William Holdaway (1893–1967), New Zealand cricketer